Big Brother 1999 is the first season of the Dutch version of Big Brother, and also served as the debut season of the Big Brother franchise. The show ran between September 16 and December 30, 1999 for a total of 106 days and was broadcast by the Dutch television channel Veronica. The specially built house was located at a factory-site in Almere and presented by Rolf Wouters and Daphne Deckers.

Development
The program was an instant hit and experienced exceptionally high ratings. Viewers and stream-watchers of internet forum FOK! alike were fascinated by the boredom and the group dynamics of the nine housemates. Brabant-born Ruud was considered to be the alpha male of the little community. This Burgundian became the darling of the public with his often repeated oneliners and his simple philosophies in the diary room. His lieutenant was the Frisian Willem, who took up the role of house cook. Hotly debated was the relation between the leading female, housewife Karin (who had recently been cured of cancer), and her much younger 'mate' Maurice. Also much talked about was a sex-scene between youngsters Bart and Sabine. The long-awaited action under the blankets was captured by the night-vision cameras in the bedroom.

The first-ever evicted housemate was Martin, who also vied for Sabine's attention and had accused Bart of being gay. He was voted out with 30% of the vote with Bart being a close second. The first-ever voluntary exit was for young Tara, who left after only nine days because of boredom. Much maligned was Amsterdam-born intruder Mona, who took her place. In the end, Willem betrayed his friend Ruud in the nominations, and Bart became the first-ever winner of Big Brother. He has won ƒ250,000.

During the season the housemates were visited by artists George Baker, Marco Borsato and Anouk. After they had left the house, both Tara and Sabine obtained photoshoots in the Dutch Playboy. The communally recorded song Big Brother and the tune Leef (Han van Eijk) reached number one in the pop charts.

Housemates

Anouk
Anouk Drost was a 22-year-old account management student from Zeist. She entered on Day 48 and was evicted on Day 70.

Bart
Bart Spring in 't Veld was the first winner of Big Brother in the world. He was 22 when he entered and he was from Roelofarendsveen.

Bianca
Bianca Plune was a 25-year-old civil servant from Rotterdam. She entered on Day 1, and walked on Day 43 in exchange for 10,000 Guilder.

Cyrille
Cyrille van Hoof was a singer and dancer from Tilburg. She was 26 when she entered the house. She was evicted on Day 56 and entered on Day 48 with Anouk.

Karin
Karin van Elswijk was 39 years old and was the oldest female in the house. She was a housewife from Apeldoorn. She was the last remaining female and was evicted on Day 99.

Martin
Martin was the first-ever evictee in Big Brother. He was a 32-year-old company owner from Spijkenisse.

Maurice
Maurice was always struggling with ping pong, widely believed to be the main reason to be ousted early on the show.

Mona
Mona Rooth-de Leeuw was a 29-year-old barwoman from Amsterdam. She replaced Tara on Day 15 and she took a 10,000 Guilder bribe from Big Brother on Day 43.

Ruud
Ruud Benard was a 44-year-old sport masseur from Breda. He was the oldest housemate in the house and made it to the final, finishing second.

Sabine
Sabine Wendel was a 25-year-old saleswoman from Tilburg. She was the second to be evicted on Day 36.

Tara
Tara van den Bergh was a 20-year-old police constable from Amsterdam. She became the first person ever to walk away. Tara left on Day 10 due to being bored.

Willem
Willem Boomsma was a 37-year-old cook from Lemmer. He made it to the final and finished third.

Nominations table

Notes

References

1999 Dutch television seasons
01